Alexander Hamilton Handy (December 25, 1809 – September 12, 1883) was a Mississippi attorney who served on the Mississippi Supreme Court from 1853 to 1867, sitting as Chief Justice of Mississippi from 1864 to 1867.

Biography
Handy was born in Somerset County, Maryland on December 25, 1809, the son of Betsey (née Wilson) and George Handy. He studied at the Washington Academy and was admitted to the bar in 1834. After marrying, he moved to Mississippi with his family, in 1836. In 1853, he was elected as an associate justice on the High Court of Errors and Appeals and was reelected in 1860, and again in 1865. 
on April 18, 1864, he was made Chief Justice, where he served until October 1, 1867. He resigned his office due to the Reconstruction-era subjection of the court to military power by the Federal government. Thereafter, he returned to Baltimore, Maryland where he practiced law and taught at the University of Maryland Law School. In 1871, he moved back to Canton, Mississippi where he died on September 12, 1883.

Handy was a secessionist, opining of the "black" Republican Party that:

Personal life
In 1835, he married Susan Wilson Stuart. His daughter Arianna Handy married German-Jewish immigrant musician and conductor Otto Sutro (also brother of San Francisco mayor Adolph Sutro). His granddaughters were the piano duettists Rose and Ottilie Sutro.

References

1809 births
1883 deaths
Washington Academy alumni
People from Somerset County, Maryland
University of Maryland School of Medicine faculty
People from Canton, Mississippi
Sutro family
19th-century American judges
Justices of the Mississippi Supreme Court
19th-century American businesspeople